Trends in Cardiovascular Medicine is a peer-reviewed medical journal publishing review articles covering cardiology. It was established in 1991 and is published 8 times per year by Elsevier. The editor-in-chief is Dougla Zipes (Indiana University School of Medicine). According to the Journal Citation Reports, the journal has a 2018 impact factor of 4.462.

References

External links

Cardiology journals
Review journals
Elsevier academic journals
Publications established in 1991
English-language journals
8 times per year journals